Les Enfants Sauvages (French for "The Wild Children") is a live album by French heavy metal band Gojira that was released in 2014. It was released as a CD/DVD set in a 60-page hardcover photo book.

Track listing
CD/DVD

References

Gojira (band) video albums
2014 live albums
Live video albums
2014 video albums
Gojira (band) albums